The dot-probe paradigm is a test used by cognitive psychologists to assess selective attention.

According to Eysenck, MacLeod & Mathews (1987) and Mathews (2004) the dot-probe task derives directly from research carried out by Christos Halkiopoulos in 1981. Halkiopoulos, later a doctoral student of Eysenck, carried out this research while he was a psychology undergraduate at UCL, under the supervision of professor N.F. Dixon. He introduced an attentional probe paradigm, which he initially used in the auditory modality to assess attentional biases to threatening auditory information, when threatening and non-threatening information was presented simultaneously to both ears in a dichotic listening task. Halkiopoulos demonstrated attentional biases by measuring reaction times to auditory probes following neutral and emotional words in the attended and the unattended channels. This method was subsequently used in the visual modality by MacLeod, Mathews and Tata (1986) in what came to be known as the dot probe paradigm.  As professor Mathews puts it when in an interview he discusses his team's research and his collaboration with Eysenck: "Then Michael Eysenck made contact, and we picked the idea for the dot probe method from his student, Christos Halkiopoulos. I certainly remember that being a really fun time" (Mathews in Borkovec, 2004, p.13). Halkiopoulos's initial research is described by Eysenck, MacLeod and Mathews (1987) and, in some more technical detail, by Eysenck (1991). 

"In many cases, the dot-probe paradigm is used to assess selective attention to threatening stimuli in individuals diagnosed with anxiety disorders. Biases have also been investigated in other disorders via this paradigm, including depression, post-traumatic stress disorder and chronic pain. Attention biases toward positive stimuli have been associated with a number of positive outcomes such as increased social engagement, increased prosocial behavior, decreased externalizing disorders, and decreased emotionally withdrawn behavior.

Procedure and method

During the dot-probe task, participants are situated in front of a computer screen and asked to stare at a fixation cross on the center of the screen. Two stimuli, one of which is neutral and one of which is threatening, appear randomly on either side of the screen. The stimuli are presented for a predetermined length of time (most commonly 500ms), before a dot is presented in the location of one former stimulus. Participants are instructed to indicate the location of this dot as quickly as possible, either via keyboard or response box. Latency is measured automatically by the computer.  The fixation cross appears again for several seconds and then the cycle is repeated.  Quicker reaction time to the dot when it occurs in the previous location of a threatening stimulus is interpreted as vigilance to threat.

Clinical uses

Researchers have recently begun using a modified version of the dot-probe task to retrain the attentional bias. In this version, the probe replaces the neutral stimuli 100% of the time or the salient stimuli 100% of the time. Over the course of a number of trials the attentional bias for salient stimuli can be reduced (in the case of the 'replace-neutral' condition) or enhanced (in the case of the 'replace-salient' condition). This method of retraining the attentional bias is called attentional retraining.

Some studies that use a dot-probe task
 Halkiopoulos, C. (1981). Towards a psychodynamic cognitive psychology. Unpublished BSc dissertation manuscript, University College London, London, UK. PDF
 MacLeod, C., Mathews, A. M., & Tata, P. (1986). Attentional bias in emotional disorders. Journal of Abnormal Psychology, 95, 15-20.
 Amin, Z., Constable, R.T., Canli, T. (2004). Attentional bias for valenced stimuli as a function of personality in the dot-probe task. Journal of Research in Personality, 38, 15-23.
 Bradley, B.P. (1998). Attentional Bias for Threatening Facial Expressions in Anxiety: Manipulation of Stimulus Duration.
 Mogg, K, & Bradley, B.P. (1999) Orienting of attention to threatening facial expressions presented under conditions of restricted awareness.  Cognition and Emotion, 13, 713-740.
 Mather, M., & Carstensen, L. L. (2003). Aging and attentional biases for emotional faces. Psychological Science, 14, 409-415. PDF

References

Borkovec, T.D. (2004). Andrew Mathews: a brief history of a clinical scientist. In Yiend, J. (Ed.), Cognition, Emotion and Psychopathology: Theoretical, Empirical and Clinical Directions. Cambridge University Press.

Eysenck, M. W> (1991)Trait anxiety and cognition. in C. D. Spielberger, I.G., Sarason, Z. Kulczar & J. Van Heck (Eds.), Stress and Emotion (Vol. 14). Hemisphere.
Cognition